Percy Creek may refer to one of the following streams:

Canada
British Columbia
Percy Creek (Indian Arm), in the Lower Mainland
Percy Creek (Slocan River), in the West Kootenay Region
Ontario
Percy Creek (Northumberland County), a tributary of the Trent River in Central Ontario
Percy Creek (Sudbury District), a tributary of the Batchawana River in Northeastern Ontario